The 2017–18 NCAA Division I women's ice hockey season began in September 2017 and ended with the 2018 NCAA Division I women's ice hockey tournament's championship game.

Pre-season polls

The top 10 from USCHO.com and the top 10 from USA Today/USA Hockey Magazine, First place votes are in parentheses.

Regular season

Standings

Player stats

Scoring leaders

Leading goaltenders

Awards

Patty Kazmaier Award
Daryl Watts, Boston College

AHCA Coach of the Year

Ivy League honors
 Kristin O'Neill, Cornell, PLAYER OF THE YEAR
 Maddie Mills, Cornell, ROOKIE OF THE YEAR
 Doug Derraugh, Cornell, COACH OF THE YEAR

All-Ivy
FIRST TEAM ALL-IVY
 Kristin O'Neill, Cornell, Forward
 Maddie Mills, Cornell, Forward
 Carly Bullock, Princeton, Forward
 Sarah Knee, Cornell, Defense
 Jaime Bourbonnais, Cornell, Defense
 Mallory Souliotis, Yale, Defense
 Marlène Boissonnault, Cornell, Goaltender
 
SECOND TEAM ALL-IVY
 Becca Gilmore, Harvard, Forward
 Karlie Lund, Princeton, Forward
 Greta Skarzynski, Yale, Forward
 Claire Thompson, Princeton, Defense
 Stephanie Sucharda, Princeton, Defense
 Stephanie Neatby, Princeton, Goaltender

HONORABLE MENTION ALL-IVY
 Sam Donovan, Brown, Forward
 Lenka Serdar, Cornell, Forward
 Kat Hughes, Harvard, Forward
 Christine Honor, Dartmouth, Goaltender
 Gianna Meloni, Yale, Goaltender

References

 
NCAA
NCAA Division I women's ice hockey seasons